Rutlish School is a state comprehensive school for boys, formerly a grammar school with the same name originally located on Rutlish Road, Merton Park, and relocated in 1957 on nearby Watery Lane, Merton Park, in southwest London.

History
The school is named for and honours the benefactor William Rutlish, embroiderer to Charles II. Rutlish was a resident of the parish of Merton and is buried in the churchyard of the parish church of St Mary. Rutlish died in 1687 and left £400 for a school (about £ today) for the education of poor children of the parish.

By the 1890s the charity had accumulated a considerable excess of funds and John Innes, a local landowner and chairman of the board of trustees, used some of the excess to establish a school.

Grammar school
The first school building, established as a grammar school in the 1890s, was located in what is still designated Rutlish Road, off Kingston Road, by Merton Park station (now a tram stop). After World War II the school had outgrown its Victorian buildings (and the science block, built in the 1930s, had been destroyed as a result of enemy action) so in the early 1950s, John Innes buildings off nearby Mostyn Road were converted for use as the Junior School.

Though the work was not completed and the heating system was not installed, this opened after a delay, in late September 1953. A new building was planned for the rest of the school, on the present site south of Watery Lane. The new school buildings opened in September 1957.

Both this and the Junior School were on land that had belonged to John Innes and which had been occupied until 1945 by the John Innes Horticultural Institution (now the John Innes Centre in Norwich).  The original buildings in Rutlish Road were later temporarily used as a girls' school (Surrey County Council, Pelham County Secondary Girls School) and then a Middle School (London Borough of Merton, Pelham Middle School, until 1974), buildings subsequently demolished to be replaced by a mix of retirement and warden-assisted flats.

School buildings
The 1957 school buildings are arranged around three sides of a quadrangle. To the north is a four-storey main entrance block (which contained the school library on the top floor, and a CCF rifle range in the roof space) and a three-storey central block of general purpose classrooms facing Watery Lane. To the west is a two-storey science block and to the east a two-storey block containing the canteen on the ground floor and the school hall on the first floor. Attached to the rear of the east block is the school gym. Also in the middle of the two buildings is a maths block on the second floor.

Among the existing school buildings is one which has ties to John Innes. The "Manor House" adjacent to the school entrance on Watery Lane was Innes's home; a blue plaque records his association. The Manor House was used as the staff room and headmaster's office on the ground floor, and sixth form rooms on the first floor.

Now demolished were school buildings next to the playing field; these were once the library and offices of the John Innes Institution and had ranges of greenhouses attached. In the 1950s and early 1960s these old buildings were used by the first and second year classes (known as forms 2A, 2B, 2C, 3A, 3B, 3C and 3D, alternating each year with either a three or four form intake) and the long greenhouse was used as a lunchtime canteen and a cloakroom. Later, in the 1980s, they were art and music rooms. A little-known feature of the old building was a warren of hidden crawlspace passages, accessible from the second floor music room, from where clandestine spying operations on other classes could be undertaken.

In the 1970s, part of the roof-space housed the 4 mm scale model railway layout. To the southeast aspect of the buildings was the Croquet Lawn, elegantly laid on a slope comparable to that of Yeovil Town Football Club, a small allotment area for the Gardening Club adjoined as well. There was also a pair of 'Fives' courts (Fives is a game like squash, but played with the hands not rackets). As part of the CCF, during the 1950s, 60s and 70s the school also had a bungie launched glider.

A number of additional buildings have been constructed over the years to supplement the facilities of the 1950s buildings.

Comprehensive
Following the education reforms of the late 1960s, the school became a comprehensive although it retained many of its grammar school traditions long after the conversion - school houses (named after ancient warrior nations or groups), uniforms with house and school colours, a Combined Cadet Force (CCF), and prefects. For many years the school maintained a croquet lawn for the use of the headmaster and the prefects. The school also operated an exchange programme with Eton College for a number of years.

Three-tier system
In the 1970s the education system in Merton was altered to use a three-tier structure (primary, middle and high school) in place of the former two-tier structure and Rutlish lost the first three of its years. The school still retained the old year names; however, so that pupils starting at the school began as "fourth" years. The following years were named "remove", "fifth", "transitus" and "sixth" (actually a pupil's fifth year at the school if he remained that long). Transitus and sixth-form pupils had their own common room on the first floor of the main block.

School Motto
 The school motto is: Modeste Strenue Sancte; meaning: "Be modest, be thorough and find righteousness".

School Houses

For most of the school's history, the pupils of the school have been assigned to houses. Although discontinued for some years, the system was reinstated in January 2010 with eight houses:

 Argonauts
 Carthaginians (formerly Crusaders),
 Kelts (a deliberate misspelling of Celts to differentiate the initial from Carthaginians)
 Parthians
 Romans
 Trojans
 Spartans
 Vikings

Various inter-house competitions, often of a sporting nature, are held.

Old Rutlishians' Association

Since 1906 the Old Rutlishians' Association ("Old Ruts"), with a large ground and clubhouse in Poplar Road, Merton Park, has existed as an Old Boys sports and social club linked to the school which former pupils of the school are eligible to join. With the loss of the sixth forms the number of former pupils joining the association fell and membership has been opened to all-comers.

Notable alumni

 Tariq Ahmad, Baron Ahmad of Wimbledon, member of the House of Lords from 2010
 James Boiling, cricketer
 Tom Braddock, Labour MP from 1945 to 1950 of Mitcham (1898–1903)
 Raymond Briggs, illustrator, best known for The Snowman (1945–52)
 Derek Cons, judge of the Supreme Court of Hong Kong
 Gerry Cottle, former owner Gerry Cottle's Circus, Moscow State Circus, Chinese State Circus; owner Wookey Hole Caves (1956–61; ran away to join the circus)
 Jason Cundy, Chelsea, Crystal Palace and Tottenham football player.
 John Dennis, (1942–49), Bishop of St Edmundsbury and Ipswich from 1986 to 1996 and father of Hugh Dennis
 Sir Frank Edward Figgures, first secretary general from 1960 to 1965 of the European Free Trade Association (EFTA), and director general from 1971 to 1973 of the National Economic Development Office (NEDO) (1921–28)
 Steve Finnan, Liverpool and Ireland footballer (1989–1992)
 Sir David Follett, director from 1960 to 1973 of the Science Museum (1919–26)
 Tubby Hayes, jazz musician (1946–51)
 Neville Heath, murderer, executed in 1946 (1928–33)
 Tariq Knight, TV illusionist (1996–2000)
 Sir John Major, Prime Minister from 1990 to 1997 (1954–59)
 Dean McDonald English professional footballer (1998–2002)
 Sir Morien Morgan, aeronautical engineer and master from 1972 to 1978 of Downing College, Cambridge (1924–31)
 Geoff Norcott, comedian, writer and political commentator
 Sir Patrick Geoffrey O'Neill, professor of Japanese at the School of Oriental and African Studies, University of London
 Sir Frederick Page, aeronautical engineer (1928–35)
 Geoffrey Paul, Bishop of Bradford from 1981 to 1983 (1932-9)
 Chris Perry, footballer
 Bernarr Rainbow, organist (1926–33)
 John Rostill, musician, The Shadows third bass guitarist (1953–59)
 Douglas Seale, actor and director (1925–32)
 Stephen Shaw, Prisons and Probation Ombudsman since 2001 and director from 1981 to 1999 of the Prison Reform Trust (1964–71)
 Keith Sutton, artist (1935–40)
 Mick Talbot, musician
 Frank Taylor, Conservative MP from 1961 to 1974 for Manchester Moss Side (1919–26)
 Mark Thomas (1980–85) editor, 2003-08 of The People newspaper
Sir Chris Wormald, permanent secretary of the Department of Health and Social Care
Joseph Samuel Myers, mathematician at Trinity College, Cambridge specialising in combinatorics, involved in film X+Y and featured in Channel 4 Documentary Beautiful Young Minds

Victoria Cross holders
Two Old Rutlishians, George Edward Cates and John Dimmer, have been awarded the Victoria Cross.

References

External links
 Official school website
 Old Rutlishians' Association
 Rutlish Foundation

Boys' schools in London
Secondary schools in the London Borough of Merton
Educational institutions established in 1895
1895 establishments in England
Voluntary controlled schools in London